The Saint Marys River is an  tributary of the South River in Augusta County in the U.S. state of Virginia. By the South and Maury rivers, it is part of the James River watershed.

The river flows through the Blue Ridge Mountains, rising north of the Blue Ridge Parkway near the highlands known as Big Levels, and flows west to the South River near the village of Steeles Tavern.

See also
List of rivers of Virginia

References

USGS Hydrologic Unit Map - State of Virginia (1974)

Rivers of Virginia
Tributaries of the James River
Rivers of Augusta County, Virginia